The women's 60 metres event at the 1955 Pan American Games was held at the Estadio Universitario in Mexico City on 13 and 14 March. It was the first of only two times that this event was contested at the Games before being discontinued after 1959.

Medalists

Results

Heats

Final

References

Athletics at the 1955 Pan American Games
1955